Abbey Court Hotel is a hotel located at 20 Pembridge Gardens, in Notting Hill, London. Built in 1830, the hotel is housed in a white-stucco Victorian townhouse. The hotel has 22 rooms, with Italian marble bathrooms.

References

External links
Official site

Hotels in London
Hotel buildings completed in 1830
1830 establishments in England